Seep is a Pakistani television drama series written by Samra Bukhari, and produced and directed by Barkat Siddiqui. It debuted on TV One Pakistan on 9 March 2018.

Cast 

Usman Peerzada as Nawab Waqar Ahmed
Shahroz Sabzwari as Bilal
Sana Fakhar as Zebunnisa
Shamyl Khan as Nawab Waqas
Tara Mahmood as Fakhra
Shaista Abbas as Durr e Adan
Fareeha Jabeen as Huzoori
Farah Nadir as Razia
Khalid Zafar
Imran Bukhari
Jinaan Hussain as Sumaiyya
Saba Khan 
Diya Mughal
Faheem Abbas

Soundtrack

The title song was sung by Rahat Fateh Ali Khan. The music was composed by Sahir Ali Bagga and the lyrics were written by Imran Raza.

References

2018 Pakistani television series debuts
2018 Pakistani television series endings
Pakistani drama television series
TVOne Pakistan
Urdu-language television shows